This is a list of schools in the London Borough of Haringey, England.

State-funded schools

Primary schools

Alexandra Primary School
Belmont Infant School
Belmont Junior School
Bounds Green Infant School
Bounds Green Junior School
Brook House Primary School
Bruce Grove Primary School
Campsbourne Infant School
Campsbourne Junior School
Chestnuts Primary School
Coldfall Primary School
Coleridge Primary School
Crowland Primary School
The Devonshire Hill Primary School
Earlham Primary School
Earlsmead Primary School
Eden Primary School
Ferry Lane Primary School
Harris Academy Tottenham
Harris  Primary Academy Coleraine Park
Harris Primary Academy Philip Lane
Highgate Primary School
Holy Trinity CE Primary School
Lancasterian Primary School
Lea Valley Primary School
Lordship Lane Primary School
The Mulberry Primary School
Muswell Hill Primary School
Noel Park Primary School
North Harringay Primary School
Our Lady of Muswell RC Primary School
Rhodes Avenue Primary School
Risley Avenue Primary School
Rokesly Infant School
Rokesly Junior School
St Aidan's CE Primary School
St Ann's CE Primary School
St Francis de Sales RC Infant School
St Francis de Sales RC Junior School
St Gildas’ RC Junior School
St Ignatius RC Primary School
St James CE Primary School
St John Vianney RC Primary School
St Martin of Porres RC Primary School
St Mary's CE Primary School
St Mary's Priory RC Infant School
St Mary's Priory RC Junior School
St Michael's CE Primary School, Highgate
St Michael's CE Primary School, Wood Green
St Paul's and All Hallows CE Infant School
St Paul's and All Hallows CE Junior School
St Paul's RC Primary School
St Peter-in-Chains RC Infant School
Seven Sisters Primary School
South Harringay Infant School
South Harringay Junior School
Stroud Green Primary School
Tetherdown Primary School
Tiverton Primary School
Trinity Primary Academy
Welbourne Primary School
West Green Primary School
Weston Park Primary School
The Willow Primary School

Secondary schools

Alexandra Park School
Duke's Aldridge Academy
Fortismere School
Gladesmore Community School
Greig City Academy
Harris Academy Tottenham
Heartlands High School
Highgate Wood Secondary School
Hornsey School for Girls
Park View School
St Thomas More RC School
Woodside High School 

Source

Special and alternative schools
Blanche Nevile School
The Brook Special Primary School
The Grove
Haringey Learning Partnership
Riverside School
Vale School

Further education
Ada, the National College for Digital Skills
The College of Haringey, Enfield and North East London
Haringey Sixth Form College

Independent schools

Primary and preparatory schools
Assunnah Primary School
The Avenue Pre-Preparatory School and Nursery
Hyland House School
Islamic Shakhsiyah Foundation
Norfolk House School

Senior and all-through schools
Channing School
Greek Secondary School of London
Highgate School
North London Rudolf Steiner School

Special and alternative schools
The Footsteps Academy
Kestrel House School
Odyssey House School
TreeHouse School
Unique Children's School

References

 
Haringey